Chushi C. Kasanda (born 15 February 1978) is a Zambian politician.

Kasanda is a member of the National Assembly of Zambia for Chisamba. She is a member of the United Party for National Development.

References

Living people
1978 births
Zambian politicians
United Party for National Development politicians
Place of birth missing (living people)
21st-century Zambian women politicians
21st-century Zambian politicians